Catorhintha apicalis is a species of leaf-footed bug in the family Coreidae.

References

Coreini
Articles created by Qbugbot
Insects described in 1852